Qiding railway station is a railway station located in Zhunan Township, Miaoli County, Taiwan. It is located on the West Coast line and is operated by Taiwan Railways.

Around the station
 Qiding Tunnels

References

1928 establishments in Taiwan
Railway stations opened in 1928
Railway stations in Miaoli County
Railway stations served by Taiwan Railways Administration